Kopsiopsis hookeri is a species of parasitic plant in the family Orobanchaceae known as Vancouver groundcone, small groundcone or poque.

Distribution
It is native to western North America from British Columbia to northern California, where it grows in wooded areas.

Description
It is a parasite of salal bushes, which it parasitizes by penetrating them with haustoria to tap nutrients. Pale-colored flowers emerge from between the overlapping bracts. Coastal aboriginal groups ate the potato-like stembase of Ground Cones raw, though usually as a snack and not in any quantity.

Formerly considered Boschniakia hookeri, some taxonomists now place it in the genus Kopsiopsis on the basis of phylogenetic evidence.

References

Orobanchaceae
Flora of British Columbia
Flora of California
Flora of Oregon
Flora without expected TNC conservation status